Pressure Points: Live in Concert is a live album by progressive rock band Camel, released in 1984. A remastered version with six bonus tracks was released in 2009 as a double CD Set.

Pressing Error On Original Release
This LP also has strong interest with vinyl collectors. When it was first released on LP in 1984 the record was pressed incorrectly (with each side matched with the wrong labels) due to a production error.  On the reverse of all 1st Pressings of this LP it states:-  "SKL 5338 NOTE:- we regret that, due to a production error, the label on Side 2 refers to the tracks on Side 1, whilst the label on Side 1 refers to the tracks on Side 2". This error was corrected very quickly, and most of the stickers were removed by buyers on purchase. Therefore, any 'mispressed' 1st Pressings of this LP with this error are now very rare indeed.

Track listing
Music by Andrew Latimer, unless noted. Lyrics by Susan Hoover except where noted.<p>
Side one
"Pressure Points" – 7:17
"Drafted" – 3:51
"Captured" – 3:02
"Lies" – 5:16
"Sasquatch" – 4:09

Side two
"West Berlin" – 5:19
"Fingertips" – 4:48
"Wait" (Lyrics by John McBurnie) – 4:28
"Rhayader" (Music by Latimer, Peter Bardens) – 2:29 
"Rhayader Goes to Town" (Music by Latimer, Peter Bardens – 6:05

Track listing 2009 Expanded & Remastered Edition

Disc 1
"Pressure Points"
"Drafted"
"Captured"
"Lies"
"Refugee" [Previously unreleased on CD]
"Vopos" [Previously unreleased on CD]
"Stationary Traveller" [Previously unreleased on CD]
"West Berlin"
"Fingertips"

Disc 2
"Sasquatch"
"Wait"
"Cloak and Dagger Man" [Previously unreleased on CD]
"Long Goodbyes" [Previously unreleased on CD]
"Rhayader"
"Rhayader Goes to Town"
"Lady Fantasy" (Bardens, Latimer, Doug Ferguson, Andy Ward)[Previously unreleased on CD]

Personnel
Camel
 Andrew Latimer – lead guitar, pan flute, vocals, producer
 Ton Scherpenzeel – lead keyboards
 Chris Rainbow – vocals, keyboards
 Richie Close – keyboards
 Colin Bass – bass, vocals
 Paul Burgess – drums, percussion

Guest appearance
 Pete Bardens – organ
 Mel Collins – saxophone

Production
 David Woolley, Haydn Bendall – engineers 
 Mick McKenna – assistant engineer
 Jonny Bealby – tape operator

References

External links
 
 

Camel (band) live albums
1984 live albums
Albums recorded at the Hammersmith Apollo
Decca Records live albums